National Memorial Day of the Exiles and Foibe (English: Day of Remembrance) is an Italian celebration for the memory of the victims of the Foibe and the Istrian–Dalmatian exodus, which led to the emigration of hundreds of thousands (between 230,000 to 350,000) of local ethnic Italians (Istrian Italians and Dalmatian Italians) from Yugoslavia after the end of the Second World War. 

The Italian Law 92 of 30 March 2004 instituted a Day of Remembrance on 10 February to commemorate the victims of Foibe and the forced exodus of nearly the entire population of Italian origin living in Dalmatia and Julian March brought about by Yugoslavia. The law also instituted a special medal to be conferred on relatives of victims.

The date of 10 February is the day on which the peace treaties of Paris were signed. These treaties transferred the previously Italian areas of Istria, Kvarner, the Dalmatian city of Zadar and most of Julian March to Yugoslavia.

Law's motivation

National Memorial Day is held annually on 10 February and is observed by all Italian political parties including the President and municipal mayors.  It commemorates the killing and forced exile of Italians and democratic or anticommunist Slavs ordered by communist dictator Josip Broz Tito.

The incidents are known as the foibe massacres and the Istrian–Dalmatian exodus. According to recent studies and a work by the historian Guido Rumici the total number of Italian victims (including people murdered during their imprisonment or deportation) ranges between 6,000 and 11,000 killed, and between 230,000 to 350,000 expelled or fled from Dalmatia, Istria and the area bordering Slovenia.

Introduction of the Law
Exiles requested recognition of the Foibe many years ago but diplomatic reasons delayed progress, given Italy's peaceful relations with president Tito, who was a useful ally against the Soviet empire during the cold war; but after the fall of Soviet Union and the dissolution of the Italian Communist Party in January 1991, a bill was passed. Italian deputies and senators almost unanimously voted in favour, and the law passed as number 92 on 30 March 2004.

Law's effect

The National Memorial Day of the Exiles and Foibe is a civilian memorial day but not as a day off from work. The law grants an award, but no money, to all relatives of murder victims, upon request. Those who died in Nazi concentration camps are also considered victims. The award consists of a certificate and a metal insignia with the wording The Italian Republic remembers. The law also institutes two museums; the Museum of Istrian-Dalmatian civilization in Trieste and the historical archive museum of Fiume, transported to Rome.

Approval and criticism
Italian president Giorgio Napolitano gave an official speech during the 2007 celebration of the "Memorial Day of Foibe Massacres and Istrian-Dalmatian exodus" in which he stated:

See also

Istria
History of Dalmatia
Foibe massacres
Istrian Italians
Dalmatian Italians
Istrian-Dalmatian exodus
Ethnic cleansing
Anti-Italianism
Croatization
Public holidays in Italy
Anniversary of the Unification of Italy
Anniversary of the Liberation
Festa della Repubblica
National Unity and Armed Forces Day
Tricolour Day

References

External links

 Text of the law on the National Memorial Day of the Exiles and Foibe
 Giorno del ricordo

Ethnic cleansing in Europe
Public holidays in Italy
Italians of Croatia
Post–World War II forced migrations